Joseph Hendricks may refer to:

 Joe Hendricks (1903–1974), U.S. Representative from Florida
 Joseph Hendricks (footballer) (born 1979), Ghanaian footballer
 Joseph M. Hendricks, professor of Christian ethics at Mercer University